Albert Bierstadt (1830–1902) was a German-born American painter best known for his lavish, sweeping landscapes of the American West. He joined several journeys of the Westward Expansion to paint the scenes. 

Bierstadt became part of the second generation of the Hudson River School in New York, an informal group of like-minded painters who started painting along the Hudson River. Their style was based on carefully detailed paintings with romantic, almost glowing lighting, sometimes called luminism. Bierstadt was an important interpreter of the western landscape, and he is also grouped with the Rocky Mountain School.

Many of his works depict natural formations within National Parks, such as Yosemite and Yellowstone.

Works

Dated works

Undated works

See also
 List of paintings by Frederic Edwin Church
 List of paintings by Thomas Cole

References

Sources
 
 Inventories of American Painting (IAP), Smithsonian Institution Research Information System(SIRIS)

 
Lists of works of art